The Rape of a Sweet Young Girl is a Canadian satirical comedy-drama film, directed by Gilles Carle and released in 1968. The film stars Julie Lachapelle as Julie, a young sexually liberated woman who gets pregnant from a casual but consensual sexual encounter and wrestles with whether to have the baby or go for an abortion, while her older brothers Raphaël (Daniel Pilon), Gabriel (Donald Pilon) and Joachim (André Gagnon) decide, without listening to Julie's own perspective, that she has been raped and set off to find the "assailant", and themselves end up committing rape against another young woman.

Following its Canadian theatrical premiere in 1968, the film was screened at the 18th Berlin Film Festival in 1968 as part of Young Canadian Film, a lineup of films by emerging Canadian filmmakers, and in the Director's Fortnight stream at the 1969 Cannes Film Festival.

References

External links
 

1968 films
Canadian comedy-drama films
Canadian satirical films
Films about abortion
Films about rape
Films directed by Gilles Carle
French-language Canadian films
1960s Canadian films